Jennifer Ward may refer to:

 Jennifer Ward (author) (born 1963), American children's picture book author
 Jennifer Ward (journalist) (born 1957), Canadian broadcast journalist
 Jennifer C. Ward (diplomat) (born 1944), United States ambassador to Niger
 Jennifer C. Ward (historian), British historian